Ambler may refer to:

Places in the United States
 Ambler, Alaska, a city
 Ambler, Pennsylvania, a borough
 Ambler River, Alaska, a tributary of the Kobuk River

Transportation-related
 Ambler Airport, Alaska, a state-owned, public-use airport
 Ambler station, a railroad station in Ambler, Pennsylvania
 Ambler's Texaco Gas Station, Dwight, Illinois, US

People
 Ambler (surname)

Other uses
 , a Royal Canadian Navy armed yacht during the Second World War
 Village of Euclid, Ohio v. Ambler Realty Co., US Supreme Court case
 A horse that can perform ambling gaits (also known as gaited horses, particularly in the U.S.)